La commedia di Amos Poe is a 2010 experimental documentary film by Amos Poe. The film had its world premiere on 1 September 2010 at the Venice Film Festival. The film is a new translation of Dante's Divine Comedy and stars Roberto Benigni and Sandro Lombardi.

Cast 
 Sandro Lombardi as Face
 Loretta Mugnai as Beatrice
 Roberto Benigni
 Anna Rezan 
 Alfonso Santagata
 Chrysa Avrami

References

External links 
 

2010 films
Punk films
Films shot in New York City
Films without speech
American independent films
Films based on works by Dante Alighieri
Works based on the Divine Comedy
2010s American films